The Lewis H. Stanton House, nicknamed "The Chimneys", is a historic house in Morris, Minnesota, United States, built in 1881.  It was listed on the National Register of Historic Places in 1982 for having local significance in the theme of architecture.  It was nominated for its Stick–Eastlake architecture and prominence among the housing stock of Morris.

History
Lewis H. Stanton (1860–1938) was the son of Edwin Stanton, who served in Cabinet-level positions with presidents James Buchanan, Abraham Lincoln, and Andrew Johnson.  The younger Stanton moved from Washington D.C. to Minnesota for health reasons, and had this house constructed for himself by a former East Coast schoolmate.  Stanton left Morris around 1890, moving with his family to New Orleans, where he spent the rest of his life.

See also
 National Register of Historic Places listings in Stevens County, Minnesota

References

1881 establishments in Minnesota
Buildings and structures in Stevens County, Minnesota
Houses completed in 1881
Houses on the National Register of Historic Places in Minnesota
National Register of Historic Places in Stevens County, Minnesota
Stick-Eastlake architecture in Minnesota